Deh Kaberi (also Romanized as Deh Kaberī) is a village in Negar Rural District, in the Central District of Bardsir County, Kerman Province, Iran. At the 2006 census, its population was 157, with 37 families.

References 

Populated places in Bardsir County